Dariusz Walęciak (born October 17, 1979 in Piotrków Trybunalski) is a Polish footballer (defender) who plays for Kolejarz Stróże.

External links
 

1979 births
Living people
Sportspeople from Piotrków Trybunalski
Polish footballers
GKS Bełchatów players
Kolejarz Stróże players
Association football defenders